UNESCO's City of Film project is part of the wider Creative Cities Network.

Film is one of seven creative fields in the Network, the others: Crafts and Folk Art, Design, Gastronomy, Literature, Media Arts, and Music.

Criteria for UNESCO Cities of Film

To be approved as a City of Film, cities need to meet a number of criteria set by UNESCO.

Designated UNESCO Cities of Film share similar characteristics:
 important infrastructure related to cinema, e.g. film studios and film landscapes/environments
 continuous or proven links to the production, distribution, and commercialisation of films
 experience in hosting film festivals, screenings, and other film-related events
 collaborative initiatives at a local, regional, and international level
 film heritage in the form of archives, museums, private collections, and/or film institutes
 film making schools and training centres
 effort in disseminating films produced and/or directed locally or nationally
 initiatives to encourage knowledge-sharing on foreign films

About the cities

In 2009, Bradford became the first film city—with Sydney joining in 2010.

Sydney is home to Fox Studios Australia, the studio that brought The Matrix trilogy, The Great Gatsby, and The Wolverine to life.  Sydney's "pristine beaches" and "lush mountains" can also provide a backdrop for location shooting.

Busan hosts an annual International Film Festival and is a "standard-setter" in the film world.

Bristol is home to the Academy award-winning Aardman Animations.  It is also home to The Bottle Yard Studios and the BBC Natural History Unit.

Bristol is "packed with history and full of character," Yamagata is a "pleasant, bustling rural capital."

Yamagata hosts every two years an International Documentary Film Festival.

Potsdam is home to Babelsberg Studio, the largest film studio in Germany. It is also home to Film Park of Babelsberg and Film University of Babelsberg.

Mumbai is home to Bollywood, the film industry that produces most films in the world.

Cities of Film

There are 21 Cities of Film, spanning 18 countries and four continents.

14 are from Europe, four from Asia, two from Oceania and one from South America.

Poland, Spain and the United Kingdom are the only countries to have two member cities.

The Cities of Film are:

See also
Creative Cities Network
City of Literature
City of Music
Design Cities
City of Crafts and Folk Arts
City of Gastronomy

References

External links
 The Creative Cities Network: Film (unesco.org)

UNESCO